Irondequoit Bay is a large body of water located in northeastern Monroe County, New York.

The center of the bay acts as the eastern border for the town of Irondequoit and the western border of the towns of Penfield and Webster. The Irondequoit–Penfield boundary continues along the center of Irondequoit Creek south of the New York State Route 404 float bridge.

During the past million years there were four glacial ages that covered the Rochester area with ice and impacted the geography of the area. About 12,000 years ago, the area underwent massive changes, which included the rerouting of the Genesee River and other water bodies. Since the earth rebounded from the melting glaciers more rapidly in Canada than in New York, water from Lake Ontario was spilled over New York due to its lower elevation. During this time, the original outlet of the Genesee River was flooded out, creating Irondequoit Bay.

On a French map of the area from 1688 titled "Le Lac Ontario" Irondequoit Bay was referred to as the "swamp of the Senecas". Prior to the 1840s, the bay was known as "Teoronto Bay."

Seven parks abut the bay:
Devil's Cove Park, Webster
Ellison Park, Penfield
Irondequoit Bay Marine Park, Irondequoit
Abraham Lincoln Park (formerly Irondequoit Bay Park East), Penfield
Irondequoit Bay Park West, Irondequoit
LaSalle's Landing Park, Penfield
Sandbar Park, Webster

See also
Irondequoit Gully

References

External links

New York State Department of Environmental Conservation page

Bays of New York (state)
Bays of Lake Ontario
Bodies of water of Monroe County, New York